Shacklock is a surname. Notable people with the surname include:

Alan Shacklock (born 1950), English musician
Constance Shacklock (1913–1999), English contralto
Frank Shacklock (1861 – 1 May 1937), English cricketer
Henry Ely Shacklock (1839–1902), Kiwi iron moulder and manufacturer
Kerry Shacklock (born 1971), English swimmer